The Pro-Chancellor of Liverpool John Moores University is an academic officer at the university, acting on behalf of the Chancellor in their absence, or when the office is vacant. As Pro-Chancellor, the holder is also appointed as "Chairman of the Board of Governors" which includes chairing governor meetings and representing the board.  The office in its own right is also representative of the university at certain events and engagements. All activities concerning the everyday functioning of the university are conducted by the Vice-Chancellor

The first Pro-Chancellor was John Moores, Jr., CBE, eldest son of Sir John Moores, CBE whom the university is named after. He was appointed in 1992 following the creation of the new generation university. Professor Maureen Williams became the second Pro-Chancellor in 1994 after serving as the universities Deputy-Chair of Governors, later being succeeded by Commodore Rod Walker who served four years in office.

As of 2007, Sir. Malcolm Thornton currently serves as the Pro-Chancellor and Chair of Governors.

List of Pro-Chancellors

References

External links
 Liverpool John Moores University - Official Website
 LJMU Board of Governors Homepage
 LJMU Governor Biographies (Sir Malcolm Thornton)

Liverpool John Moores University